Mesivta Birkas Yitzchok, also known as MBY or MBYLA, is an Orthodox Jewish yeshiva high school in Los Angeles, California.

History
Mesivta Birkas Yitzchok is a Jewish yeshiva high school that was founded in 2006 by Rabbi Shalom Tendler. Located in Los Angeles, the school opened with only ninth grade and added a class each year until it had 9th to 12th grades. Rabbi Tendler originally was the principal of Yeshiva University of Los Angeles before he left to make a new yeshiva high school.

Educational philosophy and curriculum
The school teaches a dual curriculum of Judaic studies and secular studies.  Religious studies are given primacy relative to the curriculum of secular education taught in the school. One of the school's Rabbis was named a Jewish Educator Award (JEA) recipient in 2012. Rabbi shalom tendler often hosts study groups in his house to increase student body camaraderie.

Student body

The school has a student body of approximately eighty boys from various areas of Los Angeles, the majority of whom live in the Pico-Robertson, Fairfax District and San Fernando Valley areas. The school also has a dorming option in which students from out of the Los Angeles area stay in apartments with a dorm counselor. Students who dormed have hailed from cities such as Palo Alto, San Diego, and Phoenix, Arizona. The school is thus primarily a day school, but also functions as a boarding school.

References

http://www.cde.ca.gov/re/sd/details.asp?cds=19647336136204&public=N
https://start.cortera.com/company/research/k9q3lym6k/mesivta-birkas-yitzchok/
http://www.jkidla.com/resource.asp?RID=332

External links
 - Official school website

High schools in Los Angeles
High schools in Los Angeles County, California
Jewish day schools in California
Orthodox Judaism in Los Angeles
Private high schools in California
Orthodox Jewish educational institutions
2006 establishments in California